Statistics of Latvian Higher League in the 1929 season.

Overview 
It was contested by 5 teams, and Olimpija won the championship.

League standings

References 
 RSSSF

Latvian Higher League seasons
1
Latvia
Latvia